Rodrigazo is the name given to a group of economic policies announced in Argentina on June 4, 1975, and their immediate aftermath. The name is from the fact that the policies were announced and implemented by Celestino Rodrigo, the Minister of Economy of Argentina appointed by President Isabel Perón in May 1975.

Summary
 A 150% devaluation of currency for the commercial exchange rate.
 A 100% increase in utility and transportation prices.
 A 180% rise in the price of fuel.
 A 45% increase in wages.

Aftermath
Afterward, the real wage (the purchasing power of the wage) fell, as prices overall doubled between May and August alone and continued to fall until well into 1979. The crisis had political consequences, but not all were negative. Blindsided by the draconian measure, the normally supportive CGT (the largest labor union in Latin America, at the time), called a general strikethe first ever under a Peronist government. Demanding a 125-150% mandatory wage hike, the CGT initially obtained Mrs. Perón's commitment to its enactment. As they gathered at the storied Plaza de Mayo on June 27 in gratitude for her concession, however, the president abruptly cancelled the benefit, sending demonstrators into a riot directed at Rodrigo's benefactor, the powerful Social Welfare Minister and Perón family confidant, José López Rega.  Appointing him Ambassador to Spain on July 11, the president had the Triple A death squad leader flee Argentina, and subsequently removed Rodrigo, as well as the Armed Forces Commander, General Alberto Numa Laplane, and numerous other López Rega protégés.

According to economist Guillermo Calvo, the economic turmoil that followed the Rodrigazo, including an inflation rate of around 35% a month, was one of the main reasons for the March 1976 coup that removed the Peronist government.

References

History of Argentina (1973–1976)
Economic crises in Argentina
1975 in Argentina